Mary E. (Coyne) Fantasia (October 1, 1919 – March 5, 2020) was an American politician from the state of Massachusetts.

Political career
She served in the Massachusetts House of Representatives from 1971 to 1978, representing the 4th Middlesex district from 1971 to 1974 and the 8th Middlesex district from 1975 to 1978. She lost renomination in 1978. She served as a Democratic Presidential Elector in 1960, 1964 and 1976. She was a Democratic National Committeewoman for 10 years and served as the Vice Chairwoman of the Massachusetts Democratic State Committee.

Electoral history
1990 Massachusetts 30th Middlesex District State Representative Democratic Primary

1978 Massachusetts 31st Middlesex District State Representative Democratic Primary

1976 Massachusetts 8th Middlesex District State Representative General Election

1974 Massachusetts 8th Middlesex District State Representative General Election

1972 Massachusetts 4th Middlesex District State Representative General Election

1970 Massachusetts 4th Middlesex District State Representative General Election

1970 Massachusetts 4th Middlesex District State Representative Democratic Primary

References

1919 births
2020 deaths
Members of the Massachusetts House of Representatives
1960 United States presidential electors
1964 United States presidential electors
1976 United States presidential electors
American centenarians
Women centenarians